Wolf Point South Tower is the tallest of three planned towers to be developed in the Near North Side community area of Chicago. It is planned for the Wolf Point property at the fork in the Chicago River in Downtown.

Background

On January 26, 2012, the Chicago Sun-Times broke the story that the Kennedy family was planning a three-tower development at Wolf Point. The South Tower would be the tallest of these buildings.

Location

The property upon which the development was planned is historic and drew scrutiny by critics. Plans for the tower development were presented as scheduled by the Kennedy family on land that they own in the River North neighborhood at the confluence of South, North, and Main Branches of the Chicago River southwest of the Merchandise Mart complex. As plans for the Kennedy proposal were developing on the north bank of Wolf Point, a plan for a 45- to 50-story office building on the west bank called River Point were progressing according to Robert Sharoff of The New York Times. Chicago Tribune Pulitzer Prize-winning architecture critic Blair Kamin felt that the initial plans presented by Christopher G. Kennedy needed some work.

History

On October 30, 2012, a revised plan was presented that included more open space. In November the responses to the revisions were negative, and Reilly withdrew the proposal on November 27. The Chicago Plan Commission approved the plans for the entire three-tower development that included 1,410 residential units, 450 hotel rooms and 1,285 parking stalls on January 24, 2013.

In May 2013, opponents of the planned development filed suit in United States Federal Court. On November 19, 2013, U.S. District Judge Amy J. St. Eve ruled that the valuable and iconic views of downtown are not something that can be constitutionally protected saying "Illinois courts do not recognize property values, air, or light as constitutionally protected property interests." The Wolf Point Towers broke ground in March 2014. Neighboring Wolf Point West Tower had its groundbreaking ceremony on July 18, 2014. The building opened for residence on January 13, 2016.

In July 2015, a rumor emerged that the South Tower might exceed  based on revised renderings. On November 30, 2018, Salesforce committed to a 17-year $475 million  lease in the tower commencing in 2023.

On April 2, 2020, despite the COVID-19 pandemic and the related economic slowdown that jeopardized construction projects around the world, the project secured a $500 million-plus construction loan and construction commenced within 2 days.

See also
List of tallest buildings in Chicago
List of tallest buildings in the United States

Notes

External links
Official Wolf Point website
Wolf Point South Tower at Emporis.com
Friends of Wolf Point Website
Developer website

Buildings and structures under construction in the United States
Hotels in Chicago
Residential condominiums in Chicago
Residential skyscrapers in Chicago
Skyscraper hotels in Chicago
Condo hotels in the United States